Abia is a town in Enugu State, Nigeria.

History 
Abia is a town in southern part of Udi Local Government Area of Enugu State, Nigeria. Abia is in the Umu-Neke clan, other towns that make up the clan are  Udi, Amokwe, Agbudu, Obinagu, Umuabi, Umuaga, and Nachi.

Marriage system 
The institution of marriage in Abia is generally the same as in other Igbo communities in the Eastern part of Nigeria. Marriage is contracted with the consent and participation of extended family members known as Umunna. The traditional marriage rites involve several stages with the first being Iku-aka (knocking on the door) to the final stage known as Igba nkwu (Traditional marriage). The couple becomes traditionally married after the last ceremony.

Geography 
Abia is located on Latitude: 6° 19' 48" N Longitude: 7° 24' 28" E. The postal code is 401104.

Adjacent areas 
Abia is bordered in the North by Obioma, in the South by Udi, in the East by Ozalla and Akegbe Ugwu, and in the West by Amokwe.

Climate 
As in most parts of Eastern Nigeria, Abia has a tropical climate with two distinct seasons: rainy and dry seasons characterized by temperature variations throughout the year.

Traditional institution 
There are two governing structures in Abia community. The first is represented by the traditional ruler, His Royal Majesty, the Igwe of the community and his ruling cabinet made up of representatives of all the village administrative units and advisers. The second structure is the town union headed by the elected chairman - called The President General and the members of his executive.

Religion 
Abia people are predominantly Christians. There are multiple churches in Abia that include St. Luke’s Anglican Church, St. Mark’s Catholic Church, Grace of God Mission Incorporated, Assemblies of God, Methodist Church, Winners Chapel, Holy Ghost Church, Deeper Life Bible Church, Church of Advent, and All Saints Church.

Economy and infrastructures 
In the pre-colonial days, Abia people were mostly farmers today most Abians are public servants or businesspersons. The town has supply of potable water, electricity and roads connecting to other neighboring areas.

Education 
There are two primary schools in Abia and one secondary school that is jointly owned by Abia and Udi.

Notable people 

 HRM Igwe Apostle K.S. Chime

References

Towns in Enugu State
Enugu State
Lists of towns in Nigeria
Towns in Nigeria by state